The Arbitrator is a 2017 Vietnamese crime drama series, based on the Israel crime drama series The Arbitrator (Ha-Borer).

Plot
 Part 1 : The Truthful Son (Đứa con chính trực)
From chap 1 to chap 26.
 Part 2 : The Prodigal Son (Đứa con hoang đàng)
From chap 27 to chap 48.

Cast

Phan Thị group 
 Hoàng Dũng as Phan Quân – the tycoon
 Thanh Quý as Hồ Thu – Tycoon's wife
 Thanh Hương as Phan Hương – Tycoon's daughter
 Anh Đức as "Prince-consort" Khải – Hương's husband
 Nguyễn Lê Việt Anh as Phan Hải – Tycoon's son
 Đan Lê as Diễm Mi – Hải's wife
 Nam Anh as Phan Hưng – Hải's son
 Trần Quốc Trọng as Phan Sơn – Tycoon's older brother
 Trung Anh as Lương Bổng
 Bảo Anh as Bảo Ngậu
 Trọng Hùng as Trần Tuấn
 Doãn Quốc Đam as Trần Tú – Tuấn's younger brother
 Quốc Quân as "Aurelia" Lân
 Vũ Hải as "Anabas" Hùng
 Danh Thái as A Lý
 Đặng Tam Thuận as "Scar" Thái
 Tạ Vũ Thu as "Skull" Phương
 Đức Hùng as "Bump" Phú

Thiên Long gang (Heavenly Dragon) 
 Chu Hùng as "Boss-eyed" – the tyrant
 Hoàng Anh as "Stunted" Tùng
 Duy Hưng as "Iron-face" Hoàng
 Đinh Trọng Nguyên as "Ghost-eyes" Chí

Bạch Hổ gang (White Tiger) 
 Hồng Quân as "Toothy" Phúc – the big brother
 Hoàng Du Ka as "Killer" Duy 
 Ngọc Quang as Huy Kình
 Mạnh Hùng as Huy Bá – Kình's younger brother

Lê family 
 Văn Báu as Lê Hữu
 Hương Dung as Mrs Hà – Hữu's wife
 Hồng Đăng as Lê Thành – Hữu's son
 Thu Hoài as Lê Thảo – Hữu's daughter

The cops 
 Đỗ Kỷ as Vũ Bắc
 Xuân Thông as Tuấn Anh
 Bình Xuyên as Mạnh Long
 Tiến Hợi as Brigadier Hảo

Others 
 Bảo Thanh as Mỹ Hạnh – Tuấn&Tú's younger sister
 Lưu Đê Ly as Bích Ngọc – Thành's wife
 Nguyệt Hằng as Ngọc's mother
 Thùy Dương as Quyên – Thành's former lover
 Lại Thanh Bi as Vân Điệp – Hải's first lover
 Thúy An as "Street" Hương – Hải's second lover
 Phú Thăng as Bá Thế
 Nguyễn Trọng Lân as Bá Anh – Thế's son
 Trần Nhượng as "White" Kính
 Thanh Tú as Black widow
 Quang Điền as Xuân
 Hoàng Du Ka as Duy
 Thế Bình as Mr Phong
 Thiện Tùng as Văn
 Thanh Ngọc as Yến
 Tiến Huy as Vũ

Other cast: Hồng Vân, Thu Hương, Anh Dũng, Thùy Linh, Trọng Lân, Xuân Hồng, Đặng Nam, Tiến Mạnh, Xuân Chung, Ngọc Tuấn, Đỗ Triệu, Xuân Hiền, Trương Văn Tấn.

Broadcast
The drama has released on channel VTV3 since 23 March 2017.

References
List of television programmes broadcast by Vietnam Television (VTV)

 VTV to remake Armoza drama Arbitrator
 Israeli crime drama The Arbitrator to be adapted in Vietnam
 The Arbitrator Lives with Your Mother-in-Law (Crossover)
 Tại sao bóng dáng trùm Năm Cam và đàn em có trong Người phán xử ?
 Người phán xử vừa lên sóng đã gây bão : Sao đua tranh tỏa sáng
 4 yếu tố giúp Người phán xử trở thành "phim truyện quốc dân"
 Góc nhìn đa chiều về thế giới ngầm
 Những cảnh quay trong Người phán xử khiến khán giả thót tim
 Gây "nghẽn sóng" truyền hình, Người phán xử có gì sốt thế ?
 10 câu thoại sõi đời khiến Người phán xử sốt giờ vàng
 As Vietnamese version of The Godfather
 Điểm danh dàn diễn viên hùng hậu trong phim Người phán xử
 Lương Bổng, Thế Chột được yêu thích nhất trong Người phán xử
 "Ông trùm" Hoàng Dũng nổi giận vì Người phán xử bị chê là "ghê tởm"
 So với bản gốc, Người phán xử đã giảm nhiều bạo lực và sex
 "Quyến rũ ghê gớm" : Ông trùm của Người phán xử

2017 Vietnamese television series debuts
Vietnamese drama television series
2017 Vietnamese television series endings